The State of Grão-Pará and Maranhão was one of the states of the Portuguese Empire.

History 
The state was created on 31 July 1751 by order of Sebastião José de Carvalho e Melo, 1st Marquis of Pombal, the Secretary of the State for Joseph I of Portugal.

The state was the successor to the State of Maranhão. While there were limited territorial changes, Maranhão was politically and economically restructured and its capital was moved from São Luís, in the Captaincy of Maranhão, to Santa Maria de Belém, in the Captaincy of Pará, which was raised to a unified state with Maranhão and had its name changed to Grão-Pará (English: Great wide river).

The purpose of creating this state was to stimulate economic activities.

In 1772, the state was split into two different states, the State of Grão-Pará and Rio Negro and the State of Maranhão and Piauí.

Composition 
The State of Grão-Pará and Maranhão, for the most part, retained all the same captaincies from the State of Maranhão:
Captaincy of Maranhão
Captaincy of Pará
Captaincy of Piauí
Captaincy of Ceará
Captaincy of Tapuitapera
Captaincy of Caeté
Captaincy of Cametá
Captaincy of Cabo Norte
Captaincy of Marajó
Captaincy of Xingu

References

External links

Grao-Para and Maranhao
Colonial Brazil
Portuguese colonization of the Americas
Former Portuguese colonies
Former subdivisions of Brazil
States and territories disestablished in 1772
1770s disestablishments in South America